In Catholicism, Divine Mercy is a devotion to Jesus Christ associated with the reported apparitions of Jesus to Faustina Kowalska. The venerated image under this Christological title refers to what Kowalska's diary describes as "God's loving mercy" towards all people, especially for sinners. Kowalska was granted the title "Secretary of Mercy" by the Holy See in the Jubilee Year of 2000.

Devotion

In February 1931, in Płock, Faustina Kowalska had a vision of Jesus who tasked her with spreading the devotion to his Divine Mercy.
Kowalska reported a number of apparitions during religious ecstasy which she described in her 1934–1938 diary, later published as the book Diary: Divine Mercy in My Soul. The two main themes of the devotion are to trust in Christ's endless goodness, and to show mercy to others acting as a conduit for God's love towards them.

Pope John Paul II, a native of Poland, had great affinity towards this devotion and authorized it in the Liturgical Calendar of the Roman Catholic Church. The liturgical Feast of the Divine Mercy is celebrated on the first Sunday after Easter. Worshippers of the Divine Mercy commemorate the Hour of Mercy (3 p.m.), which according to Kowalska's diary is the time of the death of Jesus. (See Mark 15:34–37 [NRSV], "At three o’clock [τῇ ἐνάτῃ ὥρᾳ, lit. "the ninth hour"] Jesus cried out with a loud voice ... 37 Then Jesus gave a loud cry and breathed his last.") Another very popular form of the devotion is the Chaplet of the Divine Mercy.

The primary focus of the Divine Mercy devotion is the merciful love of God and the desire to let that love and mercy flow through one's own heart towards those in need of it. As he dedicated the Shrine of the Divine Mercy, Pope John Paul II referred to this when he said: "Apart from the mercy of God there is no other source of hope for humankind".
There are seven main forms of this devotion:
The Divine Mercy image with the specific inscription Jesus, I trust in You; 
The commemoration of the Feast of the Divine Mercy Sunday 
The recitation of the Chaplet of the Divine Mercy 
The recitation of the Divine Mercy novena
The designation of the Hour of Mercy at 3:00 a.m. or p.m.
Spreading mercy by word, deed, or prayer
The spreading of works of mercy to the whole humanity, in preparation for the return of Jesus Christ to Earth

As in the prayers that form the Chaplet of Divine Mercy, there are three main themes to the Divine Mercy devotion: to ask for and obtain the mercy of God, to trust in Christ's abundant mercy, and finally to show mercy to others and act as a conduit for God's mercy towards them.

The first and second elements relate to the signature "Jesus I trust in You" on the Divine Mercy image and Kowalska stated that on 28 April 1935, the day the first Divine Mercy Sunday was celebrated, Jesus told her: "Every soul believing and trusting in My Mercy will obtain it."

The third component is reflected in the statement "Call upon My mercy on behalf of sinners" attributed to Jesus in Kowalska's diary (Notebook I, items 186–187). This statement is followed in the diary by a specific short prayer: "O Blood and Water, which gushed forth from the Heart of Jesus as a fount of Mercy for us, I trust in You." which Kowalska also recommended for the Hour of Divine Mercy. In her diary (Notebook II, item 742) Kowalska wrote that Jesus told her: "I demand from you deeds of mercy, which are to arise out of love for Me." and that he explained that there are three ways of exercising mercy toward your neighbor: the first-by deed, the second-by word, the third-by prayer. Kowalska's diary contain also a litany of Divine Mercy (Diary 949)

The Divine Mercy devotion views mercy as the key element in the plan of God for salvation and emphasizes the belief that it was through mercy that God gave his only son for the redemption of humankind, after the fall of Adam. The opening prayer for Divine Mercy Sunday Mass refers to this and begins: "Heavenly Father and God of Mercy, We no longer look for Jesus among the dead, for He is alive and has become the Lord of Life".

In 1959, the Vatican banned the image and devotion to it because of a number of factors. Some Polish bishops questioned Kowalska's claims and were uncomfortable with the image's similarity to the red-and-white Polish flag. Polish priests were reported to be interpreting the rays as a symbol of the flag. The ban on devotion was lifted on 15 April 1978, due to pressure from future Polish pope Karol Wojtyła, who had great interest in Kowalska. In 1987, American filmmaker Hermann D. Tauchert co-wrote, produced, and directed the film Divine Mercy: No Escape, which depicted the life of Kowalska.

Image

Paint an image according to the pattern you see with the signature: Jesus, I trust in You... I promise that the soul that will venerate this image will not perish.

The chaplet is associated with the paintings of the image as in Kowalska's diary. The most widely used is an image painted by Adolf Hyla. Hyla painted the image in thanksgiving for having survived World War II.

In the image, Jesus stands with one hand outstretched in blessing, the other clutching the side wounded by the spear, from which proceed beams of falling light, coloured red and white. An explanation of these colors was given by Kowalska, which she attributed to Jesus in her diary: "The two rays represent blood and water". These colors of the rays refer to the "blood and water'" of the Gospel of John which are also mentioned in the optional prayer of the Chaplet. The words "Jesus I Trust in Thee" usually accompany the image (Jezu Ufam Tobie in Polish).

The original Divine Mercy image was painted by Eugeniusz Kazimirowski in Vilnius in 1934 under Kowalska's direction. However, according to her diary, she cried upon seeing that the finished picture was not as beautiful as the vision she had received, but Jesus comforted her saying, "Not in the beauty of the colour, nor of the brush is the greatness of this image, but in My grace". The picture was widely used during the early years of the devotion, and is still in circulation within the movement, but the Hyla image remains one of the most reproduced renderings. After the Feast of Divine Mercy Sunday was granted to the Universal Church by Pope John Paul II on 30 April 2000 new versions of the image have emerged from a new generation of Catholic artists.

Daily devotions
In her diary Kowalska wrote that Jesus specified 3:00 p.m. each day as the hour at which mercy was best received, and asked her to pray the Chaplet of Mercy and venerate the Divine Mercy image at that hour. On 10 October 1937, in her diary (Notebook V, item 1320) Kowalska attributed the following statement to Jesus:

The time of 3:00 p.m. corresponds to the hour at which Jesus died on the cross. This hour is called the "hour of Divine Mercy" or the "hour of great mercy".

Feast day

The feast of Divine Mercy Sunday was instituted by Pope John Paul II and is celebrated the Sunday after Easter on the General Roman Calendar, and is associated with specific indulgences.

In an entry in her diary, Kowalska stated that anyone who participates in the Mass and receives the sacraments of Confession and the Eucharist on this day is assured by Jesus of full remission of their sins and punishments.

Churches and shrines
A number of Marian churches and shrines have been dedicated to Divine Mercy. One of the most important is the Gate of Dawn in Vilnius, when also the Divine Mercy image was exhibited for the first time. The original picture of Divine Mercy is in Vilnius.
 The worldwide center of the devotion is Divine Mercy Sanctuary (Kraków), commonly known as Łagiewniki. This is where Kowalska is interred, and it houses the most popular version of the Divine Mercy image (by Adolf Hyła).
 The Divine Mercy Sanctuary (Vilnius) houses Eugeniusz Kazimirowski's initial rendition.
 The Divine Mercy Sanctuary (Płock) is where Kowalska is said to have had the first vision of the Divine Mercy image. The Divine Mercy Sanctuary (Białystok) has the remains of Michał Sopoćko, the spiritual director of Kowalska and the Apostle of Divine Mercy. Głogowiec, Łęczyca County as well as nearby Świnice Warckie (central Poland) are the places of birth and childhood as well as baptism and first communion of Kowalska.
 The church of Santo Spirito in Sassia is the main center of the Divine Mercy in Rome. The National Shrine of The Divine Mercy in Stockbridge, Massachusetts, is managed by the Marian Fathers.
 The National Shrine of The Divine Mercy in Marilao, Bulacan, is the major church dedicated to Divine Mercy in the Philippines. The Divine Mercy Shrine in El Salvador, Philippines, has a 50-foot (15-meter) statue of Merciful Jesus.
 The Archdiocesan Shrine of the Divine Mercy was located in Mandaluyong, Philippines, while the Divine Mercy Chapel was located in Las Piñas, Philippines.

Orders and institutions
A number of Christian orders and institutions are devoted to the Divine Mercy. The John Paul II Institute of Divine Mercy is managed by the Congregation of Marian Fathers, which takes an active role in promoting the Divine Mercy message.

The Congregation of the Sisters of Our Lady of Mercy, to which Kowalska belonged, and the Congregation of Sisters of Merciful Jesus, established by Michał Sopoćko on the request of Christ reported by Kowalska, also have a very important role in spreading the devotion.

Two new religious communities – the Sisters of Jesus’ Merciful Passion and the Littlest Sons of the Sweetest Heart of Mary – are being raised up in Michigan through the Servants of Jesus of The Divine Mercy, a lay association of the faithful led by Archbishop Allen Vigneron.

The World Apostolic Congress on Mercy takes place every third year in various cities of the world. Continental congresses on Mercy also take place.

See also

Compassion
Sacred Heart
Atonement in Christianity
Crucifixion of Jesus

References

Further reading
Diary: Divine Mercy in My Soul by Faustina Kowalska 2003  (online version)
Pope Benedict's Divine Mercy Mandate by David Came 2009 
Explaining the Faith Series: Understanding Divine Mercy by Fr. Chris Alar, MIC 2021

External links

Polish Divine Mercy Shrines
The Congregation of the Sisters of Our Lady of Mercy (multilingual)
The Chapel of Saint Faustina on-line transmissions (multilingual)
Sanctuary of the Divine Mercy (multilingual)
Devotional organizations
Saint Maria Faustina Kowalska – TheDivineMercy.org
Faustinum Association of Apostles of the Divine Mercy
 Website about Saint Faustina and The Divine Mercy
Multilingual website of the Sisters of Merciful Jesus
Excerpts from the Diary of Saint Faustina Kowalska

 
Catholic adoration of Jesus
Catholic devotions
Christian terminology